Kozojedy is a municipality and village in Plzeň-North District in the Plzeň Region of the Czech Republic. It has about 600 inhabitants.

Administrative parts
Villages of Borek, Břízsko, Lednice and Robčice are administrative parts of Kozojedy.

References

Villages in Plzeň-North District